Maaka Pohatu is a New Zealand actor and musician. Pohatu is also a founding member of Māori showband the Modern Māori Quartet. He co-wrote and performed songs, with the other band members, for the Modern Māori Quartet's debut album That's Us! (2017).

Pohatu co-stars on the New Zealand mockumentary comedy horror television series Wellington Paranormal, part of the What We Do in the Shadows franchise. In 2018, Maaka along with other members of Modern Māori Quartet, began touring their cabaret show Modern Māori Quartet: Two Worlds. Pohatu co-hosted Māori Television's My Party Song as part of the Modern Māori Quartet.  He has had featured roles in the films Two Little Boys (2012) and Poi E (2016).

Early life 
Pohatu was born in Dunedin, New Zealand and is of Māori (Ngāi Tāmanuhiri, Ngāti Apa, Ngāti Tūwharetoa) descent. Maaka is a graduate of Toi Whakaari: New Zealand Drama School (Te Kura Toi Whakaari ō Aotearoa) earning a Bachelor of Performing Arts (Acting) in 2005.

Career

Theatre 
Pohatu performed as Ajax, in the te reo Māori version of Troilus and Cressida at the Globe Theatre, in London, alongside fellow Toi Whakaari graduates and Modern Māori Quartet bandmates, James Tito (Diomedes) and  Matu Ngaropo (Achilles). In January 2020, Maaka performed in, Modern Māori Quartet: Two Worlds, at the Off-Broadway theatre, SoHo Playhouse.

Film and television 
Pohatu made his movie debut as Gav, flatmate to Bret McKenzie's character, in Two Little Boys (2012). He portrayed Dalvanius Prime, the Māori musical legend behind the 1984 te reo Māori hit "Poi E", in the film Poi E (2016). Maaka, and the other members of the Modern Māori Quartet, served as the in-house band on Māori television’s variety show, Happy Hour (2014). He also acted in some of the show's comedy sketches. Pohatu plays the role of Sergeant Ruawai Maaka on Wellington Paranormal, the New Zealand television spin-off of Taika Waititi and Jemaine Clement's mockumentary What We Do in the Shadows.

Music 
Pohatu is a member of the Māori showband the Modern Māori Quartet, alongside Francis Kora, Matariki Whatarau and James Tito.

Personal life 
Pohatu has been given the nickname "Human Jukebox" because of his extensive musical knowledge.

Discography 
 Happy Hour (2014)
 That's Us! (2017)

References 

Year of birth missing (living people)
Living people
Actors from Dunedin
21st-century guitarists 
21st-century New Zealand male actors
21st-century New Zealand male singers
Musicians from Dunedin
New Zealand male film actors
New Zealand male Māori actors
New Zealand male singer-songwriters
New Zealand male television actors
New Zealand Māori male singers
Ngāti Apa people 
Ngāti Tūwharetoa people
Ngāi Tāmanuhiri people
Toi Whakaari alumni